Austrohancockia is an Asian genus of ground-hoppers (Orthoptera: Caelifera) in the subfamily Cladonotinae and not assigned to any tribe.

Species 
Austrohancockia includes the species:
Austrohancockia albitubercula Deng, 2019
Austrohancockia fengyangshanensis Zheng & Zhao, 2009
Austrohancockia gibba Liang & Zheng, 1991
Austrohancockia grassitti Zheng & Liang, 1987
Austrohancockia guangxiensis Zheng & Jiang, 1998
Austrohancockia gutianshanensis Zheng, 1995
Austrohancockia hubeiensis Zheng, 1992
Austrohancockia jiugongshanensis Zheng & Zhong, 2005
Austrohancockia kwangtungensis (Tinkham, 1936) - type species (as Hancockia kwangtungensis Tinkham)
Austrohancockia latifemora Deng, 2019
Austrohancockia longidorsalis Zheng, 2008
Austrohancockia okinawensis Yamasaki, 1994
Austrohancockia orlovi Storozhenko, 2016
Austrohancockia platynota Karny, 1915
Austrohancockia qiyunshanensis Zheng, 1998
Austrohancockia tuberfemora Deng, Zheng & Wei, 2008

References

External links 
 

Tetrigidae
Caelifera genera
Orthoptera of Indo-China